"Dancin'" is a song by American R&B group Guy recorded for their third studio album Guy III (2000). The song was released as the album's debut single in October 1999.

Although the group was long past their late-1980s/early-1990s heyday at this point, "Dancin'" would become Guy's highest charting single on the Billboard Hot 100 (and their only song to crack the top 40) to date, reaching #19 on that chart.  It was also a top 5 hit on the R&B chart.

Track listing
12", CD, Maxi-Single, Vinyl
"Dancin'" - 4:11
"Dancin'" (Instrumental) - 4:11
"Dancin'" (Acapella) - 4:11

Charts

Weekly charts

Year-end charts

Notes

External links

1999 singles
Guy (band) songs
Song recordings produced by Teddy Riley
1999 songs
MCA Records singles
Songs written by Teddy Riley
Songs written by Balewa Muhammad